Muhammad Iqbal (born 12 July 1927, date of death March 1996 was a Pakistani hammer thrower who competed in the 1952 Summer Olympics, in the 1956 Summer Olympics, and in the 1960 Summer Olympics.He was in the army

References

1927 births
Year of death missing
Pakistani male hammer throwers
Olympic athletes of Pakistan
Athletes (track and field) at the 1952 Summer Olympics
Athletes (track and field) at the 1956 Summer Olympics
Athletes (track and field) at the 1960 Summer Olympics
Asian Games gold medalists for Pakistan
Asian Games silver medalists for Pakistan
Asian Games bronze medalists for Pakistan
Asian Games medalists in athletics (track and field)
Athletes (track and field) at the 1954 Asian Games
Athletes (track and field) at the 1958 Asian Games
Athletes (track and field) at the 1962 Asian Games
Commonwealth Games gold medallists for Pakistan
Commonwealth Games silver medallists for Pakistan
Commonwealth Games bronze medallists for Pakistan
Commonwealth Games medallists in athletics
Athletes (track and field) at the 1954 British Empire and Commonwealth Games
Athletes (track and field) at the 1958 British Empire and Commonwealth Games
Athletes (track and field) at the 1966 British Empire and Commonwealth Games
Medalists at the 1954 Asian Games
Medalists at the 1958 Asian Games
Medalists at the 1962 Asian Games
20th-century Pakistani people
Medallists at the 1954 British Empire and Commonwealth Games
Medallists at the 1958 British Empire and Commonwealth Games
Medallists at the 1966 British Empire and Commonwealth Games